Stephanie Woodling (born in Allentown, Pennsylvania) is an American lyric mezzo-soprano, currently engaged by Deutsche Oper am Rhein, where she has performed the roles of Dorabella, Hänsel, Giulietta, Siébel, Annio (La Clemenza di Tito), Wellgunde (Das Rheingold), Kristina (Věc Makropulos), Die zweite Dame (Die Zauberflöte), Tessa (The Gondoliers), and Antonia (Tiefland). She debuted with the company in 2004 as Die zweite Magd in their new production of Elektra.

Early life and education
Woodling is a native of Allentown, Pennsylvania. She began jer musical studies with the clarinet at age 10 and continued with voice, tenor saxophone, and sousaphone. She is a graduate of Allentown Central Catholic High School.

She holds both a bachelor's and a master's degree in music from the Manhattan School of Music, where she studied with Hilda Harris and was a recipient of the President's Award.

Career
As a young artist with Santa Fe Opera for two seasons, she made her debut on their stage in the role of Die zweite Dienerin in Strauss's Die Ägyptische Helena.

Her operatic debut was in George Frideric Handel's Lotario followed by Gioachino Rossini's Le comte Ory. Her orchestral debut was with Gustav Mahler's Lieder eines fahrenden Gesellen. Woodling has since debuted with the National Symphony Orchestra at the John F. Kennedy Center for the Performing Arts, Pacific Symphony, the Los Angeles Master Chorale, and the Allentown Symphony Orchestra in Felix Mendelssohn's A Midsummer Night's Dream, having returned to sing the part of Solveig in Grieg's incidental music for Peer Gynt. Woodling is featured on Sony's live recording of Final Fantasy: More Friends, a concert for the video game series.

In 2008, she made her Baltimore Opera Company debut in the role of Stephano in Charles Gounod's Romeo et Juliette. With New York City Opera, Woodling has performed in A Little Night Music, Rigoletto, and La Traviata. Previously a young artist with Opera Pacific, she appeared in a number of roles, most notably Donna Elvira in Don Giovanni, which a critic described as providing "an intellectual burst of animation into the proceedings, giving a charming, brash, and thorough reading."

Other Opera Pacific credits include Meg in Little Women, Flora, Mercedes in Carmen, Jade Boucher in Dead Man Walking, and Die zweite Dame in The Magic Flute.

Recent operatic debuts include Lyric Opera of Kansas City as Stephano in Romeo and Juliet, OK Mozart Festival as Ciesca in Gianni Schicchi, and Mrs. Segstrom in Los Angeles Opera's production of A Little Night Music.

External links 
 Official website

References 

Living people
Year of birth missing (living people)
Allentown Central Catholic High School alumni
Musicians from Allentown, Pennsylvania
Manhattan School of Music alumni
American mezzo-sopranos
21st-century American women